Quinto Creek, originally El Arroyo de Quinto, later Kinto Creek, is a tributary stream of the San Joaquin River that now fails to reach the river.  Its source drains the slopes of the Diablo Range within the Central Valley of California, United States.  The Creek has its source in Stanislaus County a canyon a half mile north of Pine Springs Hill, a 2386 foot mountain, about 16 miles from its mouth just east of where it emerges from the foothills in Merced County, shortly ending where it joins the Outside Canal.  The closest populated place is Ingomar that is 3.6 miles east of the mouth of Quinto Creek.

History

El Arroyo de Quinto was a watering place on El Camino Viejo in the San Joaquin Valley between Arroyo de Mesteño and Arroyo de Romero.

References

Rivers of Stanislaus County, California
Rivers of Merced County, California
El Camino Viejo
Rivers of Northern California